Madison Country Day School is a nonsectarian, private day school in Dane County, Wisconsin for grades PreK through 12. The school has an enrollment of about 450 students. It is accredited by the Independent Schools Association of the Central States (ISACS), and is a member of the National Association of Independent Schools (NAIS). It is an International Baccalaureate (IB) World School that offers the IB Diploma Program to high school students. Madison Country Day School is informally known as "MCDS".

History
The school began classes on September 2, 1997. The school was originally planned for a  site in the Town of Westport donated by PDQ convenience store founder Sam Jacobsen, with buildings to be designed by Robert A. M. Stern Architects. However, when a conditional use permit was denied by the Dane County Zoning and Natural Resources Committee, the school rented quarters in a former schoolhouse in the town of Martinsville. Twenty-two students enrolled in 1997 for pre-kindergarten, kindergarten, and Grades 1–3. Additional grades were added one at a time. A $3 million renovation project in 2001 converted sleeping rooms of the former Yahara Center into classrooms. An upper school was formed when the ninth grade was added in 2003. The first senior class graduated in the spring of 2007. In 2015, a fundraiser began called Spreading Our Wings. The goal was to raise 6.8 million dollars in order to expand the school. The fundraiser was named after the school mascot, the fictional Prairie Hawk.

Curriculum
MCDS is an International Baccalaureate World School and accredited by the Independent Schools Association of the Central States (ISACS) and is a member of the National Association of Independent Schools (NAIS).

MCDS enrolls students from pre-kindergarten through 12th grade. The school has three divisions: The lower school covers pre-kindergarten through fourth grade. The middle school contains fifth through eighth, and the high school ninth through twelfth grade.

References

Private high schools in Wisconsin
International Baccalaureate schools in Wisconsin
Educational institutions established in 1997
Private middle schools in Wisconsin
Private elementary schools in Wisconsin
Schools in Dane County, Wisconsin
1997 establishments in Wisconsin